Ronald K. Mikolajczyk (born June 2, 1950) is a former professional American football offensive tackle and retired professional wrestler. He attended the University of Tampa, graduating in 1971.

Mikolajczyk grew up in Passaic, New Jersey where he attended Passaic High School.

Career 
Mikolajczyk began his professional career in 1972, with the Toronto Argonauts of the Canadian Football League. He was subsequently drafted in the 5th round of the National Football League's 1973 player draft by the Oakland Raiders, however he would end up playing the 1973 season with the Argonauts, and was released after that year.

He then played the 1974 and 1975 seasons in the World Football League, with the Memphis Southmen.

In 1976, Mikolajczyk joined the NFL's New York Giants, playing for four seasons.

After four years out of football, he joined the United States Football League, playing for the Tampa Bay Bandits, Memphis Showboats and Orlando Renegades.

During off season, and during his four-year break from football, Mikolajczyk was a professional wrestler, entering the business due to his friendship with Jerry Lawler.

References

External links
Ron Mikolajczyk profile at NFL.com
 

1950 births
Living people
American football offensive linemen
New York Giants players
Players of American football from New Jersey
Toronto Argonauts players
Memphis Southmen players
Tampa Bay Bandits players
Memphis Showboats players
Washington Federals/Orlando Renegades players
Tampa Spartans football players
Marshall Thundering Herd football players
Sportspeople from Passaic, New Jersey
Professional wrestlers from New Jersey
American male professional wrestlers
Passaic High School alumni